"Yankee Doodle" is a traditional song and nursery rhyme, the early versions of which predate the Seven Years' War and American Revolution. It is often sung patriotically in the United States today. It is the state anthem of Connecticut. Its Roud Folk Song Index number is 4501. The melody is thought to be much older than both the lyrics and the subject, going back to folk songs of Medieval Europe.

Origin

The tune of "Yankee Doodle" is thought to be much older than the lyrics, being well known across western Europe, including England, France, Netherlands, Hungary, and Spain. The melody of the song may have originated from an Irish tune "All the way to Galway" in which the second strain is identical to Yankee Doodle. The earliest words of "Yankee Doodle" came from a Middle Dutch harvest song which is thought to have followed the same tune, possibly dating back as far as 15th-century Holland. It contained mostly nonsensical words in English and Dutch: "Yanker, didel, doodle down, Diddle, dudel, lanther, Yanke viver, voover vown, Botermilk und tanther." Farm laborers in Holland were paid "as much buttermilk (Botermelk) as they could drink, and a tenth (tanther) of the grain".

The term Doodle first appeared in English in the early 17th century and is thought to be derived from the Low German dudel, meaning "playing music badly", or Dödel, meaning "fool" or "simpleton". The Macaroni wig was an extreme fashion in the 1770s and became slang for being a fop.  Dandies were men who placed particular importance upon physical appearance, refined language, and leisure hobbies. A self-made dandy was a  British middle-class man who impersonated an aristocratic lifestyle. They notably wore silk strip cloth, stuck feathers in their hats, and carried two pocket watches with chains—"one to tell what time it was and the other to tell what time it was not". 

The macaroni wig was an example of such Rococo dandy fashion, popular in elite circles in Western Europe and much mocked in the London press. The term macaroni was used to describe a fashionable man who dressed and spoke in an outlandishly affected and effeminate manner. The term pejoratively referred to a man who "exceeded the ordinary bounds of fashion" in terms of clothes, fastidious eating, and gambling.

In British conversation, the term "Yankee doodle dandy" implied unsophisticated misappropriation of upper-class fashion, as though simply sticking a feather in one's cap would transform the wearer into a noble. Peter McNeil, a professor of fashion studies, claims that the British were insinuating that the colonists were lower-class men who lacked masculinity, emphasizing that the American men were womanly.

Early versions
The song was a pre-Revolutionary War song originally sung by British military officers to mock the disheveled, disorganized colonial "Yankees" with whom they served in the French and Indian War. It was written at Fort Crailo around 1755 by British Army surgeon Richard Shuckburgh while campaigning in Rensselaer, New York. The British troops sang it to make fun of their stereotype of the American soldier as a Yankee simpleton who thought that he was stylish if he simply stuck a feather in his cap. It was also popular among the Americans as a song of defiance, and they added verses to it that mocked the British troops and hailed George Washington as the Commander of the Continental army. By 1781, "Yankee Doodle" had turned from being an insult to being a song of national pride.

According to one account, Shuckburgh wrote the original lyrics after seeing the appearance of Colonial troops under Colonel Thomas Fitch, the son of Connecticut Governor Thomas Fitch. According to the Online Etymology Dictionary, "the current version seems to have been written in 1776 by Edward Bangs, a Harvard sophomore who also was a Minuteman." He wrote a ballad with 15 verses which circulated in Boston and surrounding towns in 1775 or 1776.

A bill was introduced to the House of Representatives on July 25, 1999, recognizing Billerica, Massachusetts, as "America's Yankee Doodle Town". After the Battle of Lexington and Concord, a Boston newspaper reported:

The earliest known version of the lyrics comes from 1755 or 1758, as the date of origin is disputed:

The sheet music which accompanies these lyrics reads, "The Words to be Sung through the Nose, & in the West Country drawl & dialect." The tune also appeared in 1762 in one of America's first comic operas The Disappointment, with bawdy lyrics about the search for Blackbeard's buried treasure by a team from Philadelphia. An alternate verse that the British are said to have marched to is attributed to an incident involving Thomas Ditson of Billerica, Massachusetts. Ditson attempted to purchase a Brown Bess musket from a British soldier in the 47th Regiment of Foot in Boston on March 1775; after a group of the soldier's comrades spotted the transaction as it was occurring, they tarred and feathered Ditson in order to prevent any such illegal purchases from happening in the future. Ditson eventually managed to secure a musket and fought at the Battles of Lexington and Concord. For this reason, the town of Billerica is called the home of "Yankee Doodle":

Another pro-British set of lyrics believed to have used the tune was published in June 1775 following the Battle of Bunker Hill:

"Yankee Doodle" was played at the British surrender at Saratoga in 1777. A variant is preserved in the 1810 edition of Gammer Gurton's Garland: Or, The Nursery Parnassus, collected by Francis Douce:

Full version

The full version of the song as it is known today:

Tune
The tune shares with "Jack and Jill" and English language nursery rhyme "Lucy Locket". It also inspires the theme tune for the children's television series, Barney & the Backyard Gang, Barney & Friends, and the 1960s US cartoon series Roger Ramjet. Danish band Toy-Box sampled the tune in their song "E.T".

Notable renditions
During the aftermath of the Siege of Yorktown, the surrendering British soldiers looked only at the French soldiers present, refusing to pay the American soldiers any heed. The Marquis de Lafayette was outraged and ordered his band to play "Yankee Doodle" in response to taunt the British. Upon doing so, the British soldiers at last looked upon the Americans.

See also
Yankee Doodle Dandy, 1942 musical film
"The Yankee Doodle Boy", 1904 song

Notes

References

Further reading

External links

Library of Congress Yankee Doodle music website
#4d5a6b Hex Color - Yankee Doodle - Color Hex Map
The Boston Yankee Doodle Ballad
The free sheet music

Writings
Report on "The Star-Spangled Banner," "Hail Columbia," "America," "Yankee Doodle" by Oscar George Theodore Sonneck (1909) 2 3 4
Famous American songs (1906)

Historical audio
Yankee Doodle (archive.org)
John H. Hewitt wrote the song The Fall of Mexico in 1847, which quotes from Yankee Doodle in measure 237.

1755 songs
Works about the French and Indian War
Songs of the American Revolutionary War
British folk songs
American folk songs
American military marches
American patriotic songs
American children's songs
United States state songs
Music of Connecticut
Symbols of Connecticut
Burl Ives songs
American nursery rhymes
English nursery rhymes
English children's songs
Traditional children's songs
Songs based on American history
Tarring and feathering in the United States
Songs about fictional male characters